William Arthur Scott (birth unknown – death unknown) was a New Zealand professional rugby league footballer who played in the 1910s and 1920s.

Playing career

International honours
Scott represented New Zealand in 1919 against Australia (3 matches), and in 1920 against Great Britain.

References

New Zealand national rugby league team players
New Zealand rugby league players
Place of birth missing
Place of death missing
Rugby league locks
Rugby league props
Wellington rugby league team players
Year of death missing
1896 births